Sadist refers to: 
 A person with sadistic personality disorder, an obsolete term for individuals who derive pleasure from the suffering of others
Sadist may also refer to:

Sexual practices
BDSM, one who engages in the erotic (sexual) practices, interpersonal dynamics, or roleplaying involving bondage, dominance and submission, and masochism
 Sadomasochism, one who engages with consenting partners in aspects of pain or humiliation for sexual pleasure
 Sexual sadism disorder, one who has a medical/psychological condition for sexual arousal from inflicting pain/humiliation on unwilling, non-consenting victims

Arts and media
 Sadist (band), an Italian metal band
 Sadist (album), their 2007 album
 "Sadist", a song by Stone Sour from House of Gold & Bones – Part 2
 The Sadist, a nonfiction book about the serial killer Peter Kürten, by Karl Berg
 The Sadist (film), a 1963 American exploitation film

See also
Cruelty
Marquis de Sade, an 18th-century French writer from whom the term sadism derives
Sadism (disambiguation)